The name Larry has been used for three tropical cyclones worldwide, two in the Atlantic Ocean and one the Australian region of the Pacific Ocean. After 2006, the name Larry was retired in Australian region.

In the Atlantic:
 Tropical Storm Larry (2003) – an erratic storm that made landfall at Paraíso, Tabasco
 Hurricane Larry (2021) – a large and long-lived hurricane that made landfall in Newfoundland

In the Australian region:
 Cyclone Larry (2006) – a severe tropical cyclone that made landfall near Innisfail, Queensland, and caused roughly AU$1.5 billion (US$1.1 billion) in damage

Atlantic hurricane set index articles
Australian region cyclone set index articles